William Henry Egan (14 February 1869 – 10 September 1943) was a British Labour politician who served as MP for Birkenhead West.

Egan was active in the Labour Party in Birkenhead, and served as secretary of the town's trades council.  He stood unsuccessfully in Birkenhead West at the 1918 and 1922 United Kingdom general elections, before winning the seat in 1923.  Although he lost it in 1924, he regained it in 1929, before finally losing it in 1931.

Egan also served on Birkenhead Town Council, and was Mayor of Birkenhead in 1939/40 and 1941/42.

References

External links 

Labour Party (UK) MPs for English constituencies
1869 births
1943 deaths
People from Birkenhead
Place of death missing
UK MPs 1923–1924
UK MPs 1929–1931
United Society of Boilermakers-sponsored MPs
20th-century English politicians